Thanga Pazham (born 6 June 1954 ), known by his screen name Jaguar Thangam, is a famous stunt choreographer in the Indian film industry who works in almost all regional languages in India primarily in Tamil Cinema. He began Silambam when he was 6 years old. In the middle of 1978, he was given the name Jaguar Thangam by a Malayalam director Mr. Chandrakumar. Following his debut in  Chandrakumar's Hindi drama Meena Bazzar (1978) as a stunt coordinator, his stunt career commenced with a brief phase of stunt sequences in nationwide film industry.

Jaguar Thangam was found by Mr. M.G.Ramachandran popularly known as M.G.R. (a famous actor and former Chief Minister of Tamilnadu ) in his early stage. As of now Jaguar Thangam completed 1000+ films in almost all languages in India. Jaguar Thangam has won Four Tamil Nadu State Film Award for Best Stunt Coordinator for Five Tamil movies.

In addition to stunt, he is also working as a actor, producer, Script writer and Director. Apart from his stunt career, he is interested in social activities and politics. Jaguar Thangam is associated as Honourable Secretary with the Film and Television Producers’ Guild of South India, which is located in Thiyagaraya Nagar in Chennai, Tamilnadu.

Early career

Jaguar Thangam started learning Silambam at the age of 6. From then till now, he has been the only person in the film industry who has mastered 27 kinds of stunt arts.

Film career
Jaguar Thangam started his film career in Hindi as a Stunt Choreographer in the movie Meena Bazaar in 1978. Following that, he has done more than 87 films in Hindi where he did 17 movies with the veteran actor Mithun Chakraborty.

He started his film career as a stunt fighter in the Tamil movie Vetri in which famous Tamil actor Vijayakanth got a lead role. He started his career as a Stunt Choreographer in Tamil movie Vaigasi Poranthachu. He worked in the Hollywood movie Blood Stone, which is the only Hollywood movie of Rajinikanth. He worked with the veteran actor Kamal Hasan in the movie Maharasan.

Jaguar Thangam completed more than 1000 films in almost all languages in the Indian film industry.

The following stunt choreographers are the students of Jaguar Thangam: Peter Hein, Anal Arasu, K. Ganesh Kumar, Stunt Silva, S. R. Murugan, and Knockout Nandha.

Personal life

Jaguar Thangam married Shanthi, whose native was in Chakkammalpuram, near Pudukkottai, Thoothukudi district, but she was born in Chennai on 24 September 1963 and was named by M. G. Ramachandran known as M.G.R. (a famous actor and former Chief Minister of Tamilnadu ). The marriage took place on 9 September 1984 at Pasumpon Muthuramalinga Dever Kalyana Mandapam in Thiyagaraya Nagar, Chennai. The couple has two sons named Vijaya Siranjeevi and Jai J Jaguar. Both are very active in Tamil cinema as Stunt Choreographer as well as actors. Vijay Chiranjeevi made his acting debut with Suryaa (2008), directed by his father.

Filmography

Films

 1990 Vaigasi Poranthachu
 1991 Naan Pudicha Mappillai
 1991 Nenjamundu Nermaiundu
 1991 Ennarukil Nee Irunthal
 1991 Vaidehi Vandhachu
 1991 Pondatti Sonna Kettukanum
 1992 Thanga Manasukkaran
 1992 Pondatti Rajyam
 1992 Thilagam
 1992 Onna Irukka Kathukanum
 1993 Manikuyil
 1993 Maharasan
 1993 Amma Ponnu
 1993 Shenbagam
 1993 Nallathe Nadakkum
 1993 Band Master
 1993 Pass Mark
 1993 Akkarai Cheemaiyile
 1993 Parvathi Ennai Paradi
 1993 Purusha Lakshanam
 1993 Kizhakke Varum Paattu
 1994 Varavu Ettana Selavu Pathana
 1994 Veettai Paaru Naattai Paaru
 1994 Sevatha Ponnu
 1994 Pandianin Rajyathil
 1994 Thamarai
 1994 Thaai Manasu
 1995 Valli Vara Pora
 1995 Thedi Vandha Raasa
 1995 Manathile Oru Paattu
 1995 Witness
 1995 Chithirai Thiruvizha
 1995 Thaikulame Thaikulame
 1995 Murai Mappillai
 1996 Amman Kovil Vaasalile
 1996 Kaalam Maari Pochu
 1996 Andha Naal
 1996 Take It Easy Urvashi
 1996 Gopala Gopala
 1996 Poomani
 1996 Purushan Pondatti
 1997 Pongalo Pongal
 1997 Pagaivan
 1997 Periya Manushan
 1997 Thadayam
 1997 Roja Malare
 1997 Thambi Durai
 1997 Pudhalvan
 1998 Kizhakkum Merkkum
 1998 Veera Thalattu
 1998 Aval Varuvala
 1998 Priyamudan
 1998 Ellame En Pondattithaan
 1998 Nilaave Vaa
 1999 Endrendrum Kadhal
 1999 Annan
 1999 Poomagal Oorvalam
 1999 Chinna Raja
 1999 Poomaname Vaa
 1999 Viralukketha Veekkam
 1999 Manaivikku Mariyadhai
 1999 Maravathe Kanmaniye
 2000 Magalirkkaga
 2000 Koodi Vazhnthal Kodi Nanmai
 2001 Seerivarum Kaalai 
 2001 Dhosth
 2001 Viswanathan Ramamoorthy
 2001 Veettoda Mappillai
 2001 Kabadi Kabadi
 2001 Shahjahan
 2001 Vadagupatti Maapillai
 2002 Unnai Ninaithu
 2002 Thenkasi Pattanam
 2002 Namma Veetu Kalyanam
 2002 Bagavathi
 2002 Mutham 
 2003 Annai Kaligambal
 2003 Student Number 1
 2003 Anbu Thollai
 2003 Dum
 2003 Vani Mahal
 2003 Thiruda Thirudi
 2003 Athanda Ithanda
 2003 Aalukkoru Aasai
 2004 Adi Thadi
 2004 Jore
 2004 Azhagesan
 2004 Adhu
 2004 Maha Nadigan
 2004 Ramakrishna
 2005 Sukran
 2005 Kannamma
 2005 Gurudeva
 2005 Girivalam
 2005 Karka Kasadara
 2005 Kaatrullavarai
 2005 Vetrivel Sakthivel
 2006 Chennai Kadhal
 2007 Thirumagan
 2007 Dhandayuthapani
 2007 Vyabari
 2007 Veeramum Eeramum
 2007 Manikanda
 2007 Pazhaniappa Kalloori
 2008 Ayyavazhi
 2008 Suryaa 
 2010 Pollachi Mappillai
 2010 Gowravargal
 2012 Idhayam Thiraiarangam
 2012 Uyir Ezhuthu
 2012 Sengathu Bhoomiyile
 2014 Snehavin Kadhalarkal
 2014 MGR Sivaji Rajini Kamal

Television
 2000 Krishnadasi
 2001 Jhala Khreedai
 2014 Romapuri Pandian

Director
 2008 Suryaa

Actor
 1990 Vaigasi Poranthachu
 1996 Gopala Gopala
 1997 Thadayam
 1998 Priyamudan
 1998 Nilaave Vaa
 2004 Ramakrishna
 2005 Vetrivel Sakthivel
 2006 Chennai Kadhal
 2015 MGR Sivaji Rajini Kamal
 2017 Julieum 4 Perum
 2022 Uzhaikkum Kaigal
 2022 Peya Kaanom

Awards

 1996 : Tamil Nadu State Film Award for Best Stunt Coordinator - Poomani
 1998 : Tamil Nadu State Film Award for Best Stunt Coordinator - Priyamudan
 1999 : Cinema Express Award for Best Stunt Master - Many movies
 2002 : Tamil Nadu State Film Award for Best Stunt Coordinator - Bagavathi
 2019 : Kalaimamani Award from the Government of Tamil Nadu.

References

External links

1956 births
Living people
Indian male film actors
Male actors in Tamil cinema
Tamil film directors
Indian action choreographers
People from Thoothukudi district
20th-century Indian male actors
21st-century Indian male actors
Male actors from Tamil Nadu
Film directors from Tamil Nadu
21st-century Indian film directors